The Battle of Mandalgarh and Banas were two major battles fought between Rana Kumbha of Mewar and Mahmud Khalji of Malwa which resulted in decisive defeat of the latter.

In 1442 Rana Kumbha left Chittor to invade Haraoti. Finding Mewar unprotected, the Sultan of Malwa,  Mahmud Khalji, burning with a desire to take revenge and wipe off the disgrace of his defeat in the Battle of Sarangpur in 1437, invaded Mewar.

Destruction of Bana Mata Temple
Arriving near Kumbalmer the Sultan prepared to destroy the temple of Bana Mata in Kelwara. A Rajput chieftain named Deep Singh collected his warriors and opposed the Sultan. For seven days Deep Singh successfully repulsed all attempts of the Sultans army to take possession of the temple.

On the seventh day, Deep Singh was killed and the temple fell into the hands of the Sultan. He razed it to the ground and destroyed the stone image that was kept in the temple. Flushed with success, he started for Chittor, and leaving a part of his army to take the fortress, advanced to attack Rana Kumbha, sending his father, Azam Humayun, towards Mandsaur to lay waste to the Rana's country.

Battle of Mandalgarh

When Rana Kumbha heard of these events, he left Haraoti to return to his dominions and came upon the Sultan's army near Mandalgarh. A battle was fought here without any decisive result. A few days later the Rana made another attack on the Sultan who was utterly defeated and fled towards Mandu.

Battle of Banas

To retrieve this disaster, Mahmud set about preparing another army, and four years later, on 11-12 October 1446 A.D. he went towards Mandalgarh with a large army. Rana Kumbha attacked him while he was crossing the Banas River, and having defeated him drove him back to Mandu.

Aftermath
Mahmud Khalji suffered defeats at the hands of Rana Kumbha and was humbled thrice. For about 10 years after these defeats, Mahmud Khalji did not venture to take offensive against Rana Kumbha.

References

Citations

Sources 

 
 

History of Rajasthan
Mandalgarh and Banas